Nanak Chand Thakur (born 20 March 1971) is an Indian alpine skier. He competed in two events at the 1992 Winter Olympics.

Alpine skiing results
All results are sourced from the International Ski Federation (FIS).

Olympic results

References

External links
 

1971 births
Living people
People from Kullu district
Skiers from Himachal Pradesh
Indian male alpine skiers
Olympic alpine skiers of India
Alpine skiers at the 1992 Winter Olympics
Place of birth missing (living people)
Alpine skiers at the 1996 Asian Winter Games
Alpine skiers at the 1999 Asian Winter Games
Alpine skiers at the 2003 Asian Winter Games